In aeronautics, tufts are strips of yarn or string, typically around , attached to an aircraft surface in a grid pattern and imaged during flight. The motion of the tufts during flight can be observed and recorded, to locate flow features such as boundary layer separation and reattachment. Tufting is, therefore, a technique for flow visualization. They are used in aeronautics flight testing to study air flow direction, strength, and boundary layer properties.

The world's largest bed of tufts (18.6 m by 18.6 m, 61 feet by 61 feet) was created at NASA Ames Research Center to study air flow fields involving a helicopter's rotor disk.

See also
Yaw string

References

Aeronautics
Yarn